Stiansen is a Norwegian surname. Notable people with the surname include:

Bent Stiansen, Norwegian chef
Jorun Stiansen, Norwegian former Idol  winner
Svein-Erik Stiansen, Norwegian speed skater  
Tom Stiansen, Norwegian former alpine skier

Norwegian-language surnames